Edita Mildažytė (born February 28, 1966) is a Lithuanian journalist, documentarian and social activist, widely known as the host of the longest running talk show in Lithuanian TV history, “Bėdų turgus” (Buy My Trouble), on air since 2001.

Biography
Mildažytė was born in Kapsukas  (now Marijampolė), Southern Lithuania, the capital of Lithuania’s ethnographic region of Suvalkija, to Vytautas Mildažis and Gražina Marė Petkūnienė.

In 1973-1975 she was a student at Kaunas 27th secondary school, later continued her studies at Vilnius 34th secondary school, from which she graduated in 1984.

In 1984-1989 she completed her studies in journalism at the History Faculty of Vilnius University.

In 1987, Mildažytė won a competition and was selected as an announcer at the Lithuanian public broadcaster, Lithuanian National Radio and Television (LRT). She has worked with LRT’s various programs since, including the morning show “Labas rytas” (Good Morning), “Vakaro žinios” (Late Night News), corporate entertainment events, national award ceremonies and live broadcasts including Lithuania Joining the European Union Program (2004), and live coverage of the funeral of Pope John Paul II.

In 1993-1997, Mildažytė worked as a newsreader at LRT’s late-night news program “Vakaro žinios".
In 1997, Mildažytė launched one of the first TV talk shows in Lithuania, “Bobų vasara". Mildažytė also established a vocal group “Bobų vasara,” which performed nationally.

In 1997-2000 Edita visited various Lithuanian towns performing with the vocal group, Bobų vasara".

In 1999-2001, she also ran a radio program under the same name at the national commercial radio station Radiocentras

In 2000 Edita Mildažytė edited and presented a public TV show "2 blis" and "Noriu papasakot".

In 2001, Mildažytė started a charity talk show “Bėdų turgus” (Buy My Trouble) at LRT. The show’s concept is to collect dramatic stories (of illness, loss, etc.) from across Lithuania and find a sponsor to “buy” this problem. The show has remained popular since its first broadcast.

In 2001, Edita started the Green Apple Donor Appreciation Concert, wherein the Green Apple Award (by sculptor Marius Jonutis) was introduced to honor people noted for their charity work or the qualities of generosity, decency etc.

In 2002 "Bėdų turgus" was established as a charity trust.

In 2002, "Nupirk duonos alkstantiems" (Buy bread for the starving) was organized

In 2002- 2008, four CDs ("Nepamirštoms žvaigždėms", Gražiausios miuziklų dainos", Itališka plokštelė", Karuselė") were recorded for charity.

In 2002- 2008 Mildažytė produced the television shows "Keliaukim", "Moterys ir vyrai", "Jau saulelė vakarop", and "Pulsas".

During the 2003 Green Apple Donor Appreciation Concert , disabled people were for the first time invited to perform together with national celebrities.

From 2004 - 2007 she created the "List of National Values]", and prepared it for translation.

In 2005 - 2007 she produced a CD, Žvaigždės motinoms" and a DVD, Retro" and, Mamai".
In 2005 - 2007 Edita started "Christmas soup", a charitable collection action. Money collected was donated to the Order of Malta's charity program "Food on Wheels."

In 2005, under Edita's leadership, the first concert dedicated to Mother's Day was organized, where local celebrities were performing together with their moms.

In 2003 - 2008, she produced the annual concerts, Daugiau saulės, daugiau šviesos" ("Let in the sun, let in the light").

In 2006 - 2007, she held an event for "the greatest moms", (mothers who raised 5 or more children).

In 2007 the Internet site www.diabites.lt was launched to facilitate fundraising for the procurement of insulin pumps for diabetic children. The website is a subsidiary of the charity trust "Bėdų turgus".

In 2008 Mildažytė visited the United States to fundraise for the "Diabites" program.

In 2008 she compiled the first "List of National Treasures", dedicated to Lithuanians par excellence.

In 2009, she produced and directed the Millennium of Lithuania Celebration Concert, which was performed in the Cathedral Square, Vilnius.

In 2010, Mildažytė wrote the script and conducted the mass event dedicated to the 20th anniversary of Lithuanian independence.

In 2010, the "Bėdų turgus" charity trust organized a fundraising campaign “Lithuania-Georgia. One Heart,” to support children affected by the war in Georgia after the Russo-Georgian War in 2008. Altogether LTL 247,000 (roughly USD 100,000) was raised during the action.

In 2011, a monument to the philanthropists of the city of Vilnius unveiled in the city centre. Concept idea by Edita Mildažytė. Sculpture by Romas Kvintas.

In 2014 Mildažytė directed the quadrennial Lithuanian Song Festival.

Charity work
Since 2002, Mildažytė has run the charity foundation “Bėdų turgus”. According to the 2012 financial report, the trust had distributed donations worth EUR 1.8 million (USD 2 million). The trust also operates a separate line "Diabites", to help procure insulin pumps for diabetic children. In 2010, the trust organized a fundraising campaign “Lithuania-Georgia. One Heart,” to support children affected by the war in Georgia after the Russo-Georgian War in 2008.

She has also worked to revive Lithuania’s ethnographic and culinary traditions, and to promote inter-communal dialogue. During the Hanukkah of 2011, she launched a campaign in the restaurants of Vilnius to promote potato pancakes (latkes) with cranberry sauce, which feature in both Jewish and Lithuanian cuisine.

Personal life
Mildažytė is married to an architect and entrepreneur Gintautas Vyšniauskas. Together they have 5 children. The family is currently living in Vilnius.

Awards
V.Raskas award of Lietuvos vaikų fondas, "The Lithuanian children's fund",  (2003)
 Order of Concord by Lithuania Concord Foundation (2004)
 Moteris Award for Woman of The Year (2005)
 Order of the Lithuanian Grand Duke Gediminas (State Award) (2007)
 Republic of Georgia Presidential Order of Excellence (2011)
 Citizen of the Year of Estonia (2012)
 Lithuanian National Radio and Television award "Auksinė bitė" as best television show presenter (2014)

Filmography
 Documentary "Algirdas Mykolas Brazauskas" about Lithuania's fourth president since 1918 Algirdas Brazauskas, co-production with R.Sakalauskaitė (2010)
 Documentary "Solo virš Atlanto" about Feliksas Vaitkus, an American born Lithuanian pilot and the world's sixth pilot to fly solo across the Atlantic (2011)
 Documentary "Neokupuotas" about Lithuania freedom fighter Antanas Terleckas, co-production with R.Sakalauskaitė (2012). The film premiered on 11 January 2012.
 Documentary "Fanios Vilnius" about a Holocaust survivor Fania Brantsovskaja (2013) 
 Documentary "Vytautas Kasiulis. Iki Paryžiaus ir atgal" about a Lithuania-born painter of the French artistic school "School of Paris" Vytautas Kasiulis s (2013)
 Documentary "Post Scriptum" (2013)
 Documentary "Romain Gary. A Promise Delivered" about a Lithuania-born French writer Romain Gary (2014)
 Documentary "Kazys Napoleonas Kitkauskas. Kertiniai akmenys" about a famous Lithuanian restoration architect (2014)

Bibliography
 Pasimatymas su Lietuva. – Vilnius: Tyto alba, 2011. – 423 p.: iliustr. + 1 garso diskas (CD). – 
 Lithuania of a First Date (translated by Diana Bartkutė-Barnard, Joseph Everatt, Andrius Užkalnis and Ada Mykolė Valaitis). – Vilnius: Tyto alba, 2012. – 423 p.: iliustr. + 1 CD.

References

External links
Diabites
Beduturgus

Lithuanian television presenters
People from Marijampolė
1966 births
Living people
Lithuanian film directors
Lithuanian women film directors
20th-century Lithuanian women writers
20th-century Lithuanian writers
21st-century Lithuanian women writers
21st-century Lithuanian writers
Lithuanian women television presenters
Lithuanian women journalists